Nick Piercey (born 7 December 1960) is a broadcaster.

Early career

Nick Piercey started his broadcasting career on University Radio Stations in Bath in 1979 and 1980, and University of Kent from 1981 to 1984, before becoming a trainee at Invicta FM in late 1984. At the same time, he was also working at Radio Top Shop.

Beacon Radio

After working at VMR Virgin Megastore Radio throughout 1985, Piercey then joined Beacon Radio in Wolverhampton, doing weekend overnights.

He was then promoted to the weekday afternoon show on Beacon Radio in February 1986, where he remained until February 1987.

Radio Tees

From then on, he was heard on Radio Tees, (now TFM) as the Breakfast Show presenter until April 1994, and then freelanced at Radio Aire and GWR FM (Bristol & Bath) until September 1994.

Heart FM

From September 1994 Piercey returned to the Midlands and joined the then newly launched 100.7 Heart FM in Birmingham as the drivetime presenter, where he remained for 11 years and was also Breakfast show cover.

In addition to drivetime, he also presented a Saturday mid-morning show, then moved to Saturday evenings and then Saturday Breakfast. He also did the CD chart on Sundays. He remained on the station until August 2005.

The Arrow and BBC Local Radio

Piercey was then to be heard doing a prerecorded show on Birmingham's digital Rock Station The Arrow. The show went out every weekday morning from 10am to 1pm, and from 1 to 5:30pm on Sunday afternoons.

In addition to his show on The Arrow, Piercey also did some freelancing on various BBC Local Radio stations around the UK. These included BBC WM, where he regularly covered the drivetime show and various weekend programmes. He has also been heard on BBC Hereford and Worcester, BBC Radio Gloucestershire, BBC Radio Cleveland, BBC Radio Leicester, and has been Breakfast cover on BBC Three Counties Radio, BBC Radio York and also BBC Coventry and Warwickshire.

Smooth Radio

In March 2007, Piercey joined Smooth Radio in the West Midlands, presenting the weekday morning show from 10am to 1pm and the Saturday Breakfast Show from 6 to 10am. From 3 September 2007, Piercey took over the station's Weekday Breakfast Show. He was axed in September 2010 as shows started to come from Manchester.

BBC Radio Oxford and Wave 105

He can be heard on Saturday afternoons on Wave 105 and Monday to Thursday afternoon from 1 to 4pm on BBC Radio Oxford.

1960 births
Alumni of the University of Bristol
Alumni of the University of Kent
British radio personalities
British radio DJs
Living people